Cutlips Fork is a stream in the U.S. state of West Virginia.

Cutlips Fork most likely was named after the local Cutlip family.

See also
List of rivers of West Virginia

References

Rivers of Braxton County, West Virginia
Rivers of West Virginia